Adelphobates is a small genus of poison dart frogs. They are found in the central and lower Amazon basin of Peru and Brazil, possibly Bolivia. It was originally erected as a sister group to the Dendrobates and Oophaga genera. The validity of the genus is still being discussed, with the alternative being "Dendrobates galactonotus group" within Dendrobates. One species originally placed in this genus as Adelphobates captivus has since been moved to the genus Excidobates erected in 2008.

Etymology
Adelphobates is from the Ancient Greek, adelphos (brother or twin) and bates (walker or climber)."Brothers" refers to Charles W. Myers and John W. Daly, two unrelated scientists directly involved with studies of the species.

Biology
All members have conspicuous, vibrant coloration, and smooth skin. A peculiar feature of their reproduction is that tadpoles are transported to Brazil nut capsules lying on the forest floor. Cannibalism may result if more than one tadpole ends up in the same capsule.

Poison 
All poison frogs are toxic and noxious. Like frogs of the genus Dendrobates, Adelphobates contain Pumiliotoxin 251D, which is hydroxylated to Allopumiliotoxin 267A, which is 5 times more toxic. The median lethal dose is 200 µg/kg and 40 µg/kg respectively.

Species
There are three species:

References

External links

 
Poison dart frogs
Amphibians of South America
Amphibian genera